Zac Lubin (born August 19, 1989) is an American former professional soccer player who is currently the goalkeeping coach for Northern Colorado Hailstorm FC in USL League One.

Career

College and Amateur
Lubin spent his entire college career at Saint Martin's University.  He made a total of 67 appearances for the Saints and finished with a 2.17 Goals Against Average.

He also played in the Premier Development League for Kitsap Pumas and Seattle Sounders FC U-23.

Professional
In 2014, Lubin joined Swedish club IFK Luleå where he made 20 appearances. On March 20, he signed with USL club Tulsa Roughnecks FC. He made his debut for the club a week later in a 1–1 draw against Oklahoma City Energy FC.

Lubin signed with Swope Park Rangers on December 16, 2015.

On February 6, 2018, Lubin signed with the Phoenix Rising FC of the United Soccer League.

On June 30, 2018, Lubin was loaned to the Seattle Sounders FC of the MLS for their match against the Portland Timbers. Two of Seattle's three goalkeepers were injured, therefore prompting the emergency loan of Lubin.

Coaching
On July 21, 2022, Lubin joined Éamon Zayed's staff at USL League One's Northern Colorado Hailstorm FC as the goalkeeping coach.

Honors

Individual 
 USL Championship All-League Second Team: 2019

References

External links
Saint Martin's Saints bio

1989 births
Living people
American soccer players
American expatriate soccer players
Kitsap Pumas players
Seattle Sounders FC U-23 players
IFK Luleå players
FC Tulsa players
Sporting Kansas City II players
Ljungskile SK players
Phoenix Rising FC players
Seattle Sounders FC players
Association football goalkeepers
Soccer players from Montana
Sportspeople from Bozeman, Montana
Expatriate footballers in Sweden
USL League Two players
USL Championship players
Northern Colorado Hailstorm FC players
Association football goalkeeping coaches
USL League One coaches
American expatriate sportspeople in Sweden
Saint Martin's Saints
Saint Martin's University alumni
College men's soccer players in the United States